The Cats' Bridge is an 1889 novel by the German writer Hermann Sudermann. It was published in English in 1898 as Regina, or The Sins of the Fathers, translated by Beatrice Marshall.

Film adaptations
The novel has been adapted for film multiple times:
 1913: Der Katzensteg, directed by Alfred Halm
 1915: Der Katzensteg, directed by Max Mack
 1927: The Catwalk, directed by Gerhard Lamprecht
 1937: Cat Walk, directed by Fritz Peter Buch
 1944: El Camino de los gatos, directed by Chano Urueta
 1975: Der Katzensteg, directed by Peter Meincke

References

External links
 The Cats' Bridge at Projekt Gutenberg-DE 
 The Cats' Bridge at Internet Archive 

1889 German novels
German novels adapted into films
Novels by Hermann Sudermann
1889 German-language novels